Paul-Olev Mõtsküla (born 6 December 1934 Tartu, died 23 January 2023 Helme) was an Estonian politician. He was a member of VII Riigikogu.

References

1934 births
Members of the Riigikogu, 1992–1995